Skellefteå (locally ) is a city in Västerbotten County, Sweden. It is the seat of Skellefteå Municipality, which had 74,402 inhabitants in 2022.

The city is historically industrial, with mining being a large part of that industry, especially for gold, leading to the city being nicknamed Guldstaden ("gold town"). Politically, Skellefteå is a Social Democratic stronghold. The city is a well-known ice hockey town, with its main team Skellefteå AIK playing in the Swedish top division: the SHL, which they have won on several occasions; most recently in 2014.

The city was incorporated in 1845 and grew to its current population size in the 1950s and 1960s, growing only slowly since. It is the second largest city in Västerbotten after Umeå and is located roughly halfway between it and Luleå.

History

The name Skellefteå is recorded to having been spelled as Skelepht in 1327.  On Carta marina the name is spelt Skellitta. The origin of the name remains unknown, but is assumed to be of Sami origin.

From the 14th century on, attempts were made to Christianize Skellefteå. A parish was formed and a church built. However, for the most part, the entire large Northern Swedish territory of Norrland was not Christianized until several hundred years after the rest of Sweden, and many northern areas such as Skellefteå remained unexplored well past the Middle Ages.

Not before the very end of the 17th century did the indigenous Sami people of Northern Sweden begin turning to Christianity, much due to the efforts by the Northern Swedish superintendent Mathias Steuchius, who worked hard to accomplish this. Several Sami priests were killed for this reason.

Eventually, the reason for the sudden awakened interest towards Skellefteälven and the surrounding areas was the great northern fishing grounds of salmon.  The increased demand for fish was sparked by a stricter enforcement of the annual month-long fasting by the Catholic Church, whereby meat was substituted by fish. 

The actual city of Skellefteå is one of the youngest cities of Norrland. It was founded in 1845 by the vicar Nils Nordlander.

Today
In the 20th century, Skellefteå evolved to an industrial and mining city and many wooden houses were demolished to make room for brick buildings. Skellefteå is now trying to become a leading city in education with the construction of Floraskolan, a school that mostly focuses on entrepreneurial learning.

It will become the home of a massive battery plant made by Northvolt by circa 2023.

The largest private employer in Skellefteå is the mining company Boliden AB, with about 1,200 employees. The mine's copper ore contains particles of gold, silver and platinum. Skellefteå is still referred to as the "Goldtown".

During the 1990s, the computer industry flourished, subsidiaries of Ericsson and Tieto Enator becoming important employers.

Climate
Skellefteå is transitioning from a subarctic climate (Dfc) to continental with mild summers and cold, snowy winters. In the 21st century the climate has more resembled the latter. The climate is somewhat moderated by the Bothnia Bay, although maritime effects are limited, ensuring very warm summer temperatures for a coastal area so far north.

Industry
Boliden AB, a big mining and smelting company
Skellefteå Kraft, largest power company in Skellefteå
Northvolt, lithium-ion battery cell manufacturing company

Transportation
The European route E4 highway provides the main road connection to the city, providing direct connections to cities like Stockholm and Sundsvall going south and Luleå going north. Riksväg 95 also serves the city. 

There is a railway branch line running through Skellefteå, although with no passenger traffic, making it the largest city in Sweden without it. The line is still served by Freight traffic.  There were plans to start night trains going from Stockholm to Skellefteå, with service being expected to commence in April 2022. Due to a decision from Trafikverket, the planned night trains were cancelled before they started running.   The closest train station in use is located in Bastuträsk, from which trains heading to several cities including Stockholm, Umeå and Luleå depart, operated by Norrtåg and Vy. There goes a bus to Skellefteå from Bastuträsk, intended for transfers to and from the trains.

Sports
Skellefteå AIK, an ice hockey team in the highest Swedish league, Swedish Hockey League (SHL). 1978, 2013 and 2014 Swedish Champions.
Morön BK, football club playing in Division 3  Norrland
Skellefteå FF, football club playing in Division 2  Norrland
Sunnanå SK, women's football (soccer)
Skellefteå IBK, floorball club
Skellefteå Innebandy IF, floorball club
The Skellefteå Kraft Grandmaster Chess Cup 1999, one of the strongest all Swedish chess tournaments was won by IGM Ulf Andersson. The event took place from March 26 – April 4, 1999. An international chess tournament, the final of the two-year World Cup series was held in Skellefteå from August 12 to September 3, 1989. The final sixteen grandmasters participating included three former World Chess Champions Garry Kasparov, Anatoly Karpov and Mikhail Tal. The activities organized around the World Cup final included two performances in Skellefteå of Chess, with music by Benny Andersson and Björn Ulvaeus of the pop group ABBA.

Notable people

People

Sportspeople 
Anders Andersson, ice hockey player
Johan Alm, ice hockey player
Viktor Arvidsson, ice hockey player for the Los Angeles Kings
Johan Backlund, ice hockey player
Evy Berggren, Gymnast, Olympic and World Champion
Filip Berglund, ice hockey player
Niclas Burström, ice hockey player
Robert Dahlgren, racing driver
Jimmie Ericsson, ice hockey player
Jan Erixon, ice hockey player
Tim Erixon, ice hockey player

Toini Gustafsson-Rönnlund, skier

Filip Gustavsson, ice hockey goaltender
Jonathan Hedström, ice hockey player
Adam Larsson, ice hockey player for the Seattle Kraken
Oscar Lindberg, ice hockey player for the Vegas Golden Knights
Mats Lindgren, ice hockey player
Joakim Lindström, ice hockey player
Gustaf Lindvall, ice hockey player
Arvid Lundberg, ice hockey player
Hanna Marklund, football player
Hardy Nilsson, ice hockey player and later coach
Joakim Nyström, tennis player
Marcus Pettersson, ice hockey player for the Pittsburgh Penguins
David Rundblad, ice hockey player
Patrik Wallón, ice hockey player
Adam Wilsby, ice hockey player

Other 
Erik Normark, YouTuber and Naturalist
Per Olov Enquist, writer
Tore Frängsmyr, historian
Ingrid García-Jonsson, Spanish-Swedish actress
Peter Haber, actor
Andreas "Vintersorg" Hedlund, musician

Helena Helmersson, CEO of H&M since 2020

Thomas Idergard, political commentator

Stieg Larsson, writer

Stig Larsson, writer
David Lindgren, musician
Anna Nordlander, painter
Victoria Silvstedt, supermodel
Henning Sjöström, lawyer
Margot Wallström, former first Vice President of the European Commission and current Special Representative on Sexual Violence in Conflict with the UN. Foreign Secretary of Sweden 2014–2019

Artists
Moon Safari, a symphonic rock band.
The Wannadies, an alternative rock band formed in 1988.
Vintersorg, a metal band.
Amber Oak, a pop-rock band.
Black Bonzo (2003-2011) and Gin Lady (2012-present), progressive-rock bands

See also
Kroksjön lake
Morö backe
Sollefteå (similar name)

References
https://web.archive.org/web/20050802111949/http://lokalhistoria.skelleftea.org/
Some material has been translated and incorporated from :sv:Skellefteå

External links

Skellefteå – Official site
Tourist in Skellefteå – Tourist information in Swedish, English and German languages

 
Populated places in Västerbotten County
Populated places in Skellefteå Municipality
Municipal seats of Västerbotten County
Swedish municipal seats
Coastal cities and towns in Sweden